Jordi Arrese and Carlos Costa were the defending champions, but none competed this year. Arrese chose to compete at the Summer Olympics in Barcelona, winning the silver medal in singles.

Nicklas Kulti and Mikael Tillström won the title by defeating Cristian Brandi and Federico Mordegan 6–2, 6–2 in the final.

Seeds

Draw

Draw

References

External links
 Official results archive (ATP)
 Official results archive (ITF)

San Marino CEPU Open
1992 ATP Tour